The 2016 KPIT MSLTA Challenger was a professional tennis tournament played on hard courts. It was the third edition of the tournament which was part of the 2016 ATP Challenger Tour. It took place at Shree Shiv Chhatrapati Sports Complex in Pune, India from 24 to 30 October 2016.

Singles main-draw entrants

Seeds

 1 Rankings are as of 17 October 2016.

Other entrants
The following players received wildcards into the singles main draw:
  Adrián Menéndez Maceiras
  Jayesh Pungliya
  Dhruv Sunish
  Vishnu Vardhan

The following players received entry from the qualifying draw:
  Marat Deviatiarov
  Luca Margaroli
  Hugo Nys
  Ranjeet Virali-Murugesan

Champions

Singles

  Sadio Doumbia def.  Prajnesh Gunneswaran, 4–6, 6–4, 6–3.

Doubles

  Purav Raja /  Divij Sharan def.  Luca Margaroli /  Hugo Nys, 3–6, 6–3, [11–9].

References

External links
Official Website

2016 in Indian tennis
KPIT MSLTA Challenger
KPIT MSLTA Challenger